The men's welterweight (63.5 kg/147.4 lbs) Full-Contact category at the W.A.K.O. World Championships 2007 in Coimbra was the sixth lightest of the male Full-Contact tournaments, involving nineteen fighters from four continents (Europe, Asia, North America and Oceania).  Each of the matches was three rounds of two minutes each and were fought under Full-Contact rules.  

As there were not enough fighters for a thirty-two man tournament, thirteen of the men received byes through to the second round.  The tournament winner was Vladimir Tarasov from Russia who defeated Kazakhstan's Stepan Avramidi in the final by unanimous decision to win gold.  Belgrade '07 Low-Kick semi finalist Ramil Nadirov from Azerbaijan and France's Edmond Mebenga won bronze medals.

Results

Key

See also
List of WAKO Amateur World Championships
List of WAKO Amateur European Championships
List of male kickboxers

References

External links
 WAKO World Association of Kickboxing Organizations Official Site

Kickboxing events at the WAKO World Championships 2007 Coimbra
2007 in kickboxing
Kickboxing in Portugal